A Nice Day at the Office is an Australian comedy series which screened on the ABC in 1972. This series was originally one episode of the anthology series The Comedy Game which screened in 1971. It was intended that some of the episodes could act as pilots for series. The other successful episodes which led to series were Our Man In Canberra, Scattergood: Friend of All and Aunty Jack. The lead role of Sean Crisp was played by John Bell in the pilot, but when he was unavailable for the series, Rod McLennan took over. Also, Neal Fitzpatrick who played Ted Harvey had limited availability, so the planned 13 episodes were cut back to seven.

Synopsis
A Nice Day at the Office satirised the public service with the two central characters, Ted Harvey and Sean Crisp, working in the Central Files office of a government department.

Harvey is a career public servant who follows every rule in the book, while Crisp is impetuous and irreverent. Their differing personalities lead to clashes and petty ways of annoying each other.

Cast
 Rod McLennan as Sean Crisp
 Neil Fitzpatrick as Ted Harvey
 Gordon McDougall as Claude Fogarty 
 Fay Kelton as Vicki Short 
 Maggie Dence as Mrs. Quiggley

See also 
 List of Australian television series

Notes

External links 
 
 A Nice Day at the Office Classic Australian TV

Australian television sitcoms
Australian Broadcasting Corporation original programming
English-language television shows
Television shows set in New South Wales
1975 Australian television series debuts
1975 Australian television series endings
Black-and-white Australian television shows